American singer-songwriter Kim Carnes has released 13 studio albums, one live album, five compilation albums, and 48 singles (including seven as a featured artist). She signed with Amos Records in 1971 and released her debut album Rest on Me in the same year. Her self-titled second album was released in the following year. Kim Carnes yielded one single, "You're a Part of Me", which became Carnes' first charting title. The song reached No. 32 on the Billboard Adult Contemporary chart. None of Carnes's albums charted until the release of her fifth studio album Romance Dance (1980). The album peaked at No. 57 on the Billboard 200, No. 77 on the Canadian Albums Chart and No. 89 on the Australian Albums Chart. Romance Dance produced two hit singles; the Smokey Robinson and the Miracles cover "More Love", which made the top 10 of the Billboard Hot 100, peaking at No. 10, and "Cry Like a Baby", which peaked right outside of the top 40, at No. 44.

Carnes' success peaked with the release of Mistaken Identity (1981), which reached No. 1 on the Billboard 200, and certified platinum by the Recording Industry Association of America (RIAA). The album's lead single "Bette Davis Eyes" was an international success, reaching No. 1 on the Billboard Hot 100 and in several other countries. Carnes' follow-up album Voyeur saw moderate success, with the title track reaching No. 29 on the Billboard Hot 100, while the second single "Does It Make You Remember" reached No. 36.

Carnes released three more albums, Café Racers (1983), Barking at Airplanes (1985) and Light House (1986), before failing to chart on the Billboard 200 again. The most successful single releases on the Billboard Hot 100 from these albums were "Invisible Hands" (No. 40), "You Make My Heart Beat Faster (and That's All That Matters)" (No. 54), and "Crazy in the Night (Barking at Airplanes)" (No. 15). Carnes permanently relocated to Nashville after the release of View from the House (1988); its lead single, "Crazy in Love", reached No. 13 on the Billboard Adult Contemporary chart. Her last two albums, Checkin' Out the Ghosts (1991) and Chasin' Wild Trains (2004), failed to chart worldwide.

Albums

Studio albums

Live albums

Compilation albums

Singles

As lead artist

As guest artist

Other appearances

Music videos

References

External links
 
 
 
 

Country music discographies
Discographies of American artists
Pop music discographies